Dequam LaWesley Wright (born January 28, 1985) is an American former professional baseball relief pitcher. He played in Major League Baseball (MLB) for the Houston Astros, Tampa Bay Rays, Chicago Cubs, Baltimore Orioles, and Los Angeles Angels of Anaheim.

Early life
Wright was born in Montgomery, Alabama, and he grew up in a Montgomery County community known as Grady. He attended Goshen High School. He was selected by the Los Angeles Dodgers in the 7th round of the 2003 Major League Baseball Draft. He had a scholarship offer from the University of South Alabama, but he signed with the Dodgers organization in June 2003.

Professional career

Los Angeles Dodgers
He made his professional debut with the Ogden Raptors in the Pioneer League in 2004 and played for the Columbus Catfish and Vero Beach Dodgers in 2005. With Columbus, he pitched in 30 games and accumulated a 1.93 era as a relief pitcher.

In 2006, he pitched in 25 games with Vero Beach, acquiring a 1.48 era and was promoted to the Jacksonville Suns, where he began 2007 before a mid-season promotion to the Las Vegas 51s.

Houston Astros
In December 2007, he was selected by the Houston Astros in the major league portion of the Rule 5 draft from the Los Angeles Dodgers. Wright made the Astros  opening day roster as the only left-handed pitcher in the bullpen. On March 31, 2008, Wright made his major league debut against the San Diego Padres and pitched 1/3 of a scoreless inning. Wright collected his first major league win on April 4, 2008, against the Chicago Cubs after pitching 1/3 of a scoreless inning again.  He collected his first major league save on July 29, 2008, against the Cincinnati Reds coming in during 9th inning with two outs, and recorded the final out of the game for the save.

On July 16, 2009, Wright was called in to pitch in a game against the Cubs in the second inning after starter Roy Oswalt was forced from the game by a strained back. Wright batted in the top of the third inning and singled to left field for his first Major League hit. Later that night, it was reported that he was rushed to the hospital after showing signs of appendicitis. He was diagnosed with dehydration.

Tampa Bay Rays

On August 12, 2013 he was traded to the Tampa Bay Rays for cash considerations. With Tampa Bay, Wright made his playoff debut in 2013, appearing in two games of the Rays' ALDS matchup with the Boston Red Sox. After the season, Wright was non-tendered by Tampa Bay, making him a free agent.

Chicago Cubs
On December 4, 2013 he agreed to a one-year, $1.425 million deal to pitch for the Chicago Cubs. The contract became official on December 16, 2013. He was non-tendered by the Cubs on December 2, 2014.

Baltimore Orioles
On December 16, 2014 he agreed to a one-year deal to pitch for the Baltimore Orioles. Wright was designated for assignment on July 15, 2015.

Los Angeles Angels of Anaheim
On July 29, 2015, Wright signed a minor league deal with the Los Angeles Angels of Anaheim.

Boston Red Sox
Wright joined the Arizona Diamondbacks for 2016 spring training, and was released on March 28, 2016. On April 12 he signed a minor league deal with the Boston Red Sox and was assigned to Triple-A Pawtucket Red Sox, where he appeared in 19 games and was released on July 11.

Texas Rangers

On January 27, 2017, Wright signed a minor league contract with the Texas Rangers. He was released on July 23, 2017.

Retirement
On November 11, 2017, it was announced Wright had decided to retire and take a job as a pro scout with the Minnesota Twins.

References

External links

Wesley Wright at Baseball Almanac

1985 births
Living people
African-American baseball players
Baltimore Orioles players
Baseball players from Montgomery, Alabama
Chicago Cubs players
Columbus Catfish players
Gulf Coast Dodgers players
Houston Astros players
Jacksonville Suns players
Las Vegas 51s players
Los Angeles Angels players
Major League Baseball pitchers
Minnesota Twins scouts
Norfolk Tides players
North Shore Honu players
Ogden Raptors players
Oklahoma City RedHawks players
Pawtucket Red Sox players
Peoria Saguaros players
Round Rock Express players
Salt Lake Bees players
Tampa Bay Rays players
Toros del Este players
American expatriate baseball players in the Dominican Republic
Vero Beach Dodgers players
21st-century African-American sportspeople
20th-century African-American people